Faiz Mattoir (born 12 July 2000) is a professional footballer who plays as a forward for the Dutch Eerste Divisie club Almere City. Born in Mayotte, he plays for the Comoros national team.

Club career
Mattoir made his senior debut with Ajaccio in a 1–1 Ligue 2 draw with Clermont on 22 November 2019. He signed his first professional contract with the club on 10 June 2020.

On 27 June 2022, Dutch Eerste Divisie club Almere City announced the signing of Mattoir on a two-year contract, with an option of an additional year.

International career
Born in the French overseas department of Mayotte, Mattoir is of Comorian descent. He debuted for the Comoros national team in a 1–1 Africa Cup of Nations qualification draw with Kenya on 11 November 2020.

International goals
Scores and results list Comoros goal tally first, score column indicates score after each Mattoir goal.

References

External links
 
 
 OL Profile

2000 births
Living people
People from Mayotte
Comorian footballers
Comoros international footballers
French footballers
Mayotte footballers
French sportspeople of Comorian descent
Association football forwards
AC Ajaccio players
SO Cholet players
Almere City FC players
Ligue 2 players
Championnat National players
Championnat National 3 players
Eerste Divisie players
2021 Africa Cup of Nations players
Comorian expatriate footballers
Expatriate footballers in the Netherlands
Comorian expatriate sportspeople in the Netherlands